The Grammy Award for Best R&B Solo Vocal Performance - Male or Female was awarded at the Grammy Awards of 1967 for music released in the previous year.  For this year only it replaced the awards for Best Female R&B Vocal Performance and Best Male R&B Vocal Performance.  The award was won by Ray Charles for "Crying Time".

Recipients

References

Grammy Awards for rhythm and blues